Robert Vandeputte (26 February 1908 – 18 November 1997), was a Belgian economist, civil servant, politician, and former governor of the National Bank of Belgium (NBB) from 1971 until 1975. He was Minister of Finance in 1981.

Sources
 Robert Vandeputte
 Robert Vandeputte, Een machteloos minister, Standaard, 1982

External links 
 Robert Vandeputte in ODIS - Online Database for Intermediary Structures 
 Archives of Robert Vandeputte in ODIS - Online Database for Intermediary Structures

Belgian economists
Belgian civil servants
Finance ministers of Belgium
Governors of the National Bank of Belgium
1908 births
1997 deaths
20th-century Belgian civil servants